Norberto Claudio Bautista (30 December 1940 – 13 May 1987) was an Argentine footballer. He played in one match for the Argentina national football team in 1963. He was also part of Argentina's squad for the 1963 South American Championship.

References

External links
 
 

1940 births
1987 deaths
Argentine footballers
Argentina international footballers
Place of birth missing
Association football defenders
Rosario Central footballers
Club Atlético Banfield footballers
Deportivo Cali footballers
Cúcuta Deportivo footballers
América de Cali footballers
Independiente Medellín footballers
Central Córdoba de Rosario footballers